LB2 or LB-2 may refer to:
 the second individual Homo floresiensis skeleton
 Nakajima LB-2, a long-range, land-based bomber developed in Japan for use by the Imperial Japanese Navy